Christian Verdun is an American artist best known for his work on the cut-up Burrough's style poetry collage Paradox. In 2010, he released another poetry assemblage utilizing the style of the previous work titled escape. Christian is currently attending UC Davis.

Paradox 

Paradox is a cut-up poetry collage forming a picture of Abraham Lincoln being Assassinated at Ford's Theater. The piece took roughly 3 years to complete. It is composed entirely of magazines which were obtained for free or dumpster dived from book stores. The name is derived from the literary device, the paradox is an anomalous juxtaposition of incongruous ideas for the sake of striking exposition or unexpected insight. It functions as a method of literary composition - and analysis - which involves examining apparently contradictory statements and drawing conclusions either to reconcile them or to explain their presence.

Escape 

In 2010, Christian Verdun finished his second piece escape which was done using the same style of his previous work. He continued the trend of using pictures of major historical significance. However this time he moved to mixing French and English text, presumably because of the French colonization of Vietnam. This image is much smaller measuring 12 inches by 12 inches.

Anonymous 

In 2013, he finished his third 11x8 inch piece anonymous, created from words cut from the comic book V for Vendetta which were remixed back together to form a picture of V wearing a Guy Fawkes mask.

See also
  - Gallery
 Paradox Website  - Flash Viewer
 Escape Website - Flash Viewer

References 

Living people
American artists
University of California, Davis alumni
Year of birth missing (living people)